Minalur  is a village in Thrissur district in the state of Kerala, India.

Demographics
 India census, Minalur had a population of 5033 with 2431 males and 2602 females.
Minaloor is a beautiful village 1 km north-west of Athani (Kerala).

References

Villages in Thrissur district